Camilla Marie Gjersem (born 6 January 1994) is a Norwegian former figure skater. She is a two-time Skate Copenhagen champion (2016, 2017), the 2016 Reykjavik International  champion, the 2014 Warsaw Cup silver medalist, the 2018 Ice Star bronze medalist, and a five-time Norwegian national champion (2012–2014, 2018, 2019). She competed in the final segment at the 2015 European Championships.

Personal life 
Camilla Marie Gjersem was born together with a twin sister, Anne Line,  on 6 January 1994 in Hønefoss, Norway. Their mother, Perlina Bangug, is a Filipina from Ilagan, Isabela, and their father, Petter Gjersem, a Norwegian from Raufoss. Camilla Gjersem is a law student at the University of Oslo.

Career 
Gjersem began skating in 2002. She received her first ISU Junior Grand Prix assignment in 2010. Training mainly in Asker, she was coached by Kaja Hanevold until the end of the 2010–11 season and then by Berit Steigendal.

Gjersem made her senior international debut at the 2011 Ice Challenge and her ISU Championship debut at the 2012 European Championships in Sheffield, England.

She was selected ahead of her sister to compete at the 2015 European Championships in Stockholm, Sweden. There she qualified for the final after placing 22nd in the short program. In the free skate she was 20th, and placed 21st overall.

In 2015, Gjersem was a favorite to win her fourth Norwegian national champion, but finished second to her sister Anne Line by a margin of 0.58 points. She was the Norwegian record holder for the ladies' short program (53.01), set at the 2015 Norwegian National Championships on January 18, 2015.

Gjersem sustained a knee injury in April 2016. She sat out most of the 2016–17 season, but competed at Skate Copenhagen in April 2017.

She retired from competition on May 7, 2019.

Programs

Competitive highlights 
CS: Challenger Series; JGP: Junior Grand Prix

References

External links

Navigation 

1994 births
Living people
Norwegian female single skaters
Norwegian people of Filipino descent
People from Ringerike (municipality)
Norwegian twins
Twin sportspeople
Competitors at the 2019 Winter Universiade
Sportspeople from Viken (county)
21st-century Norwegian women